The Messthetics is an instrumental trio formed by former Fugazi members bassist Joe Lally and drummer Brendan Canty with guitarist Anthony Pirog. Their music has been described as "jazz punk jam."

History
Lally had been living in Rome and upon returning to Washington D.C. he hooked back up with Canty and played him some of his solo work. Canty suggested Pirog join them as he had previously been impressed by him. When the three started jamming they clicked as a band and Pirog invited the other two to be his rhythm section for a project with John Zorn's Tzadik Records. They didn't end up recording for Tzadik as at their first show Ian MacKaye was impressed enough to offer them a spot on Dischord Records.

The band's first album, eponymously entitled The Messthetics, was released by Dischord in 2018. It was recorded live in Canty’s practice room. Their follow-up album, Anthropocosmic Nest, was released on September 6th, 2019. by Dischord Records. The album was featured in Bandcamp's "The Best Punk on Bandcamp" for September 2019.

Discography
The Messthetics (Dischord 2018)
Anthropocosmic Nest (Dischord 2019)

References

External links
The Messthetics at Dischord
The Messthetics at Bandcamp

American art rock groups
Dischord Records artists
Indie rock musical groups from Washington, D.C.
American musical trios
Musical groups disestablished in 2016